Santa Cruz Futebol Clube, commonly known as Santa Cruz, is a Brazilian football club based in Rio de Janeiro, Rio de Janeiro state.

History
The club was founded on October 1, 2007. The club professionalized its football department in 2009, competing in the same year in the Campeonato Carioca Third Level.

Stadium

Santa Cruz Futebol Clube play their home games at Estádio Eduardo Guinle, located in Nova Friburgo. The stadium has a maximum capacity of 6,550 people.

References

Association football clubs established in 2007
Football clubs in Rio de Janeiro (state)
2007 establishments in Brazil